Damir Vučičić (born 20 July 1977) is a Croatian rower. He competed in the men's coxless four event at the 2004 Summer Olympics.

References

1977 births
Living people
Croatian male rowers
Olympic rowers of Croatia
Rowers at the 2004 Summer Olympics
Rowers from Split, Croatia